Woman's Refuge may refer to:

A Women's shelter
Women's Refuge (film), a 1946 Argentine film